Josef Koželuh (born 15 February 2002) is a Czech footballer who currently plays as a centre back for FC Zbrojovka Brno (on loan from Viktoria Plzeň.

References

External links
 Profile at FC Zbrojovka Brno official site
 Profile at FAČR official site

2002 births
Living people
Czech footballers
FC Zbrojovka Brno players
Association football defenders
Czech National Football League players
Czech Republic youth international footballers